This local electoral calendar for 2021 lists the subnational elections held in 2021. Referendums, recall and retention elections, and national by-elections (special elections) are also included.

January
5 January: United States, Georgia
U.S. Senate (2nd round)
U.S. Senate special election (2nd round)
Public Service Commission (2nd round)
7 January: Libya, Municipal Councils
10 January: 
India, Himachal Pradesh, Municipal Councils and Town Councils
Kazakhstan, Regional Assemblies and Municipal Assemblies
11 January: Libya, Municipal Councils
11–12 January: Uganda, Sub-county and Municipal Councillors for Older Persons, Persons with Disabilities, and Youth
15 January: India, Maharashtra, Village Councils
16 January: 
Bangladesh, Mayors and Municipal Councils (2nd phase)
Nigeria, Kano, Local Government Councils and Chairmen
16–29 January: Papua New Guinea, Bougainville, Parliament by-election
17 January: India, Himachal Pradesh, District Councils, Township Councils and Village Councils (1st phase)
19 January: India, Himachal Pradesh, District Councils, Township Councils and Village Councils (2nd phase)
20 January: Uganda, District Chairs, Lord Mayors, Mayors and District Councils
Kampala Capital City Authority, Lord Mayor and Council
21 January: India, Himachal Pradesh, District Councils, Township Councils and Village Councils (3rd phase)
23 January: Libya, Municipal Councils
24 January: Japan
Gifu, 
Yamagata, 
25 January: 
Trinidad and Tobago, Tobago, House of Assembly
Uganda, Municipals Chairs and Municipal Councils
27 January: 
Bangladesh, Chittagong, Mayor and City Corporation
Uganda, District Councillors for Older Persons, Persons with Disabilities, and Youth, and District Workers Representatives
28 January: India, Rajasthan, Ajmer Municipal Corporation, Municipal Councils and Town Councils
30 January: Bangladesh, Mayors and Municipal Councils (3rd phase)

February
3 February: Uganda, Sub-county Chairs, Sub-county Councils, Municipal Division Chairs and Municipal Division Councils
6 February: Nigeria, Magama/Rijau Federal Constituency, House of Representatives by-election rerun
9 February: India, Andhra Pradesh, Village Councils (1st phase)
13 February: India, Andhra Pradesh, Village Councils (2nd phase)
14 February: 
Bangladesh, Mayors and Municipal Councils (4th phase)
India, Punjab, Municipal Corporations, Municipal Councils and Town Councils
Spain, Catalonia, Parliament
17 February: India, Andhra Pradesh, Village Councils (3rd phase)
18 February: Australia, Lord Howe Island, Board
19 February: Pakistan, NA-45 and NA-75, National Assembly by-elections
21 February: 
India
Andhra Pradesh, Village Councils (4th phase)
Gujarat, Municipal Corporations
Ahmedabad, Municipal Corporation
Laos, Provincial People's Councils
Pakistan, NA-221, National Assembly by-election
27 February: Nigeria, Yobe, Local Government Councils and Chairmen
28 February: 
Austria, Carinthia, Mayors (1st round) and Municipal Councils
Bangladesh, Mayors and Municipal Councils (5th phase)
El Salvador, 
India, Gujarat, Municipal Councils, District Councils and Township Councils

March
2 March: Federated States of Micronesia, Chuuk, Governor, House of Representatives and Senate
3 March: Belize
Corozal Bay, House of Representatives by-election
City Councils and Town Councils
4 March: Kenya, Matungu Constituency, National Assembly by-election
6 March: Nigeria, Delta, Local Government Councils and Chairmen
7 March: 
Bolivia, Governors, Departamental Legislative Assemblies, Mayors, Municipal Councils, Beni Provincial Subgovernors, Gran Chaco Regional Assembly and Tarija Sectional Executives
Switzerland
Basel-Landschaft, referendums
Bern, referendum
Geneva, referendum
Lucerne, referendums
Solothurn, Executive Council and Cantonal Council
Valais, Council of State and Grand Council
Zug, referendums
Zürich, referendums
Thailand, Nakhon Si Thammarat constituency 3, House of Representatives by-election
9 March: United States, Phoenix, City Council (2nd round)
10 March: India, Andhra Pradesh, Municipal Corporations and Municipal Councils (1st round)
13 March: 
Australia
Norfolk Island, Regional Council
Western Australia, Legislative Assembly and Legislative Council
India, Andhra Pradesh, Municipal Corporations and Municipal Councils (2nd round)
Philippines, Palawan, provincial division plebiscite
14 March: 
Austria, Carinthia, Mayors (2nd round)
Germany
Baden-Württemberg, Landtag
Hesse, County Councils, Mayors, Municipal Councils and Local Advisory Boards
Frankfurt, 
Rhineland-Palatinate, Landtag
Honduras, 
18 March: Kenya, Machakos, Senate by-election
20 March: United States
Louisiana's 2nd congressional district, U.S. House of Representatives special election
Louisiana's 5th congressional district, U.S. House of Representatives special election
21 March: Japan, Chiba, 
25 March: Canada, Newfoundland and Labrador, House of Assembly
27 March:
Nigeria
Aba North/Aba South Federal Constituency, House of Representatives by-election
Sokoto, Local Government Councils and Chairmen
India
Assam, Legislative Assembly (1st phase)
27 March – 29 April: West Bengal, Legislative Assembly
28 March: Switzerland, Valais, Council of State (2nd round)
29 March: Antigua and Barbuda, Barbuda, Council

April
1 April: India, Assam, Legislative Assembly (2nd phase)
4 April: 
France, Pas-de-Calais's 6th constituency, 
Japan, Akita, 
6 April: 
Greenland, Municipal Councils and Settlement Councils
India
Kerala, Legislative Assembly
Puducherry, Legislative Assembly
Tamil Nadu, Legislative Assembly
India, Assam, Legislative Assembly (3rd phase)
United States
Anchorage, Mayor special election
Colorado Springs, City Council
Oklahoma City, Council
St. Louis, Mayor and Board of Aldermen
Wisconsin, Superintendent of Public Instruction and Court of Appeals
7 April: 
South Korea
Busan, Mayor by-election
Seoul, Mayor by-election
9 April: India, Meghalaya, Garo Hills Autonomous District, Council
10 April: Maldives, City Councils, Atoll Councils and Island Councils
11 April: 
Bolivia, Governors (runoffs)
France, Pas-de-Calais's 6th constituency, 
Kyrgyzstan, City Councils and Village Councils
12 April: Canada, Yukon, Legislative Assembly
17 April: Nigeria, Rivers, Local Government Councils and Chairmen
18 April: 
Switzerland, Neuchâtel, Council of State and Grand Council
22 April: Isle of Man, Local Authority Commissioners and Local Authority Councils
25 April: 
Japan
Hokkaido 2nd district, 
Nagano at-large district, 
Switzerland, Appenzell Innerrhoden, Landsgemeinde

May
1 May: 
Australia, Tasmania
House of Assembly
(Derwent, Mersey and Windermere) Legislative Council
United States, Texas
Texas's 6th congressional district, U.S. House of Representatives special election
Arlington, Mayor and City Council
Dallas, City Council
Fort Worth, Mayor and City Council
San Antonio, Mayor and City Council
2 May: Switzerland, Glarus, Landsgemeinde
4 May: Spain, Madrid, Assembly 
6 May: United Kingdom, Country and local elections
Scotland, Parliament
Wales, Parliament
Police Commissioners
England, County Councils, Metropolitan Borough Councils, Unitary Authorities, District Councils, Mayors and Police Commissioners
Greater London, Mayor and Assembly
Bristol, Mayor and City Council
Buckinghamshire, Council
Cambridgeshire, Mayor and County Council
Cornwall, Council
Derbyshire, County Council
Devon, County Council
Durham, County Council
East Sussex, County Council
Essex, County Council
Gloucestershire, County Council
Greater Manchester, Mayor
Manchester, City Council
Hampshire, County Council
Hertfordshire, County Council
Isle of Wight, Council
Isles of Scilly, Council
Kent, County Council
Lancashire, County Council
Leicestershire, County Council
Lincolnshire, County Council
Liverpool City Region, Mayor
Liverpool, Mayor and City Council
Norfolk, County Council
Northamptonshire, County Council
Northumberland, County Council
Nottinghamshire, County Council
Oxfordshire, County Council
Shropshire, Council
Staffordshire, County Council
Suffolk, County Council
Surrey, County Council
Tees Valley City Region, Mayor
Warwickshire, County Council
West of England, Mayor
West Midlands, Mayor
West Sussex, County Council
West Yorkshire, Mayor
Leeds, City Council
Wiltshire, Council
Worcestershire, County Council
Hartlepool, House of Commons by-election
10 May: Canada, New Brunswick, Mayors and Municipal Councils
11 May: United States, Omaha, Mayor and City Council
13 May: United Kingdom, Airdrie and Shotts, House of Commons by-election
15 May: Slovakia, Governors and Regional Councils
15–16 May: Chile, Governors, Mayors and Municipal Councils
16 May: 
Croatia, County Prefects, County Councils, Mayors and Municipal Councils (1st round)
Zagreb, Mayor and Assembly
Split, Mayor and Assembly
Rijeka, Mayor and Assembly
22 May: Nigeria, Oyo, Local Government Councils and Chairmen
23 May: Vietnam, Provincial People's Councils, District People's Councils and Communal People's Councils
29–30 May: France, Consular Advisors and Consular Delegates
30 May:
Croatia, County Prefects, County Councils, Mayors and Municipal Councils (2nd round)
Zagreb, Mayor and Assembly
Split, Mayor and Assembly
Rijeka, Mayor and Assembly
31 May: Somaliland, Mayors and District Councils

June
1 June: United States, New Mexico's 1st congressional district, U.S. House of Representatives special election
5 June: 
Ethiopia, Regional Councils, City Councils, District Councils and Neighborhood Councils
Latvia, Municipal Councils
United States, Cherokee Nation, Tribal Council
6 June: 
Argentina, Misiones, 
Germany, Saxony-Anhalt, Landtag
Mexico, State elections and local elections
Aguascalientes, 
Baja California, 
Baja California Sur, 
Campeche, 
Chiapas, 
Chihuahua, 
Coahuila, Mayors, Trustees and Municipal Councils
Colima, 
Durango, 
Guanajuato, 
Guerrero, 
Hidalgo, 
Jalisco, 
Mexico City, 
Mexico State, 
Michoacán, 
Morelos, 
Nayarit, 
Nuevo León, 
Oaxaca, 
Puebla, 
Querétaro, 
Quintana Roo, 
San Luis Potosí, 
Sinaloa, 
Sonora, 
Tabasco, 
Tamaulipas, 
Tlaxcala, 
Veracruz, 
Yucatán, 
Zacatecas, 
13 June: 
Finland, Municipal Councils
17 June: 
United Kingdom, Chesham and Amersham, House of Commons by-election
18 June: Iran, 
Tehran, City Council
19 June: Nigeria, Gwaram Federal Constituency, House of Representatives by-election
20 June:
France, Regional Councils and Departmental Councils (1st round)
Japan, Shizuoka, 
23 June: Morocco, Regional Councils and Municipal Councils
26 June: Canada, Akwesasne, Mohawk Council
 27 June:
 Argentina, Jujuy, 
 France, Regional Councils and Departmental Councils (2nd round)
Nigeria, Jigawa, Local Government Councils and Chairmen

July
1 July: United Kingdom, Batley and Spen, House of Commons by-election
4 July: Japan, Tokyo, Metropolitan Assembly
8 July: Ireland, Dublin Bay South, Dáil Éireann by-election
18 July: Japan, Hyōgo, 
24 July: 
Nigeria
Ogun, Local Government Councils and Chairmen
Lagos, Local Government Councils and Chairmen
25 July:
Kazakhstan, Rural Heads
Pakistan, Azad Kashmir, Legislative Assembly

August
12 August: Zambia, Mayors, District Councils, Council Chairs and Municipal Councils
14 August: Nigeria, Lere Federal Constituency, House of Representatives by-election
15 August: Argentina, Salta, 
17 August: Canada, Nova Scotia, General Assembly
22 August: Japan, Yokohama, Mayor
28 August: Australia, Northern Territory, Mayors, City Councils, Town Councils, Regional Councils and Shire Councils
29 August: Argentina, Corrientes,

September
4 September: Nigeria, Kaduna, Local Government Councils and Chairmen (1st stage)
5 September: Japan, Ibaraki, Governor
11 September: Australia, Northern Territory, Daly by-election
12 September: Germany, Lower Saxony, 
Hanover Region, President (1st round) and Assembly
Hanover, 
13 September: Norway, Sámi Parliament
14 September: United States, California, Gubernatorial recall election
19 September:
Moldova, Gagauzia, People's Assembly
Russia, 
Adygea, State Council
Altai Krai, Legislative Assembly
Amur Oblast, Legislative Assembly
Astrakhan Oblast, Duma
Belgorod Oblast, Governor special election
Chechnya, Head and Parliament
Chukotka Autonomous Okrug, Duma
Chuvashia, State Council
Dagestan, People's Assembly
Ingushetia, People's Assembly
Jewish Autonomous Oblast, Legislative Assembly
Kaliningrad Oblast, Duma
Kamchatka Krai, Legislative Assembly
Karelia (Republic), Legislative Assembly
Khabarovsk Krai, Governor special election
Khanty-Mansi Autonomous Okrug, Duma
Kirov Oblast, Legislative Assembly
Krasnoyarsk Krai, Legislative Assembly
Kursk Oblast, Duma
Leningrad Oblast, Legislative Assembly
Lipetsk Oblast, Council of Deputies
Mordovia, Head special election and State Assembly
Moscow Oblast, 
Murmansk Oblast, Duma
Nizhny Novgorod Oblast, Legislative Assembly
Novgorod Oblast, Duma
Omsk Oblast, Legislative Assembly
Orenburg Oblast, Legislative Assembly
Oryol Oblast, Council of People's Deputies
Perm Krai, Legislative Assembly
Primorsky Krai, Legislative Assembly
Pskov Oblast, Assembly of Deputies
Saint Petersburg, 
Samara Oblast, Duma
Stavropol Krai, 
Sverdlovsk Oblast, Legislative Assembly
Tambov Oblast, Duma
Tomsk Oblast, Duma
Tula Oblast, Governor
Tuva, Head
Tver Oblast, Governor and Legislative Assembly
Tyumen Oblast, Duma
Ulyanovsk Oblast, Governor
Vologda Oblast, Legislative Assembly
25 September: Nigeria, Kaduna, Local Government Councils and Chairmen (2nd stage)
26 September: 
Austria, Upper Austria, Parliament, Mayors and Municipal Councils
Austria, Graz, Municipal council election
Germany
Berlin, House of Representatives, Expropriate Deutsche Wohnen and Co referendum
Lower Saxony, 
Hanover Region, President (2nd round)
Mecklenburg-Vorpommern, 
Portugal
Municipal Chambers, Municipal Assemblies, Parish Assemblies
27 September: Canada, Newfoundland and Labrador, Mayors and City Councils
30 September: Ethiopia, Southern Nations, Nationalities, and Peoples Region, Regionalization referendum

October
2 October: Georgia, Mayors and Municipal Councils
3–4 October: Italy, Local elections (1st round)
Calabria, President and Regional Council
Bologna, Mayor and City Council
Milan, Mayor, City Council, Borough Presidents and Borough Councils
Naples, Mayor and City Council
Rome, Mayor and City Council
Turin, Mayor and City Council
6 October: Nigeria, Nasarawa, Local Government Councils and Chairmen
8 October: New Zealand, Christchurch, Coastal Ward by-election
9 October: 
Nigeria, Plateau, Local Government Councils and Chairmen
10 October: Paraguay, Mayors and Municipal Boards
13 October: Saint Helena, Ascension and Tristan da Cunha, Saint Helena, Legislative Council
14–27 October: Germany, Bavaria, 
16 October: Australia
Christmas Island, Shire Council
Cocos (Keeling) Islands, Shire Council
Western Australia, Mayors, Regional Councils, City Councils and Shire Councils
17 October: 
Estonia, Municipal Councils
Kosovo, Mayors and Municipal Councils
North Macedonia, Mayors and Municipal Councils
17–18 October: Italy, Local elections (2nd round).
18 October: Canada, Alberta, Referendum and Mayors and Municipal Councils
Calgary, Mayor, City Council and School Trustees
Edmonton, Mayor, City Council and School Trustees
25 October: Canada, Nunavut, Legislative Assembly
25 October: Somalia, Puntland, Municipal elections
31 October: Japan, Miyagi, Governor

November
1 November: South Africa, District Councils, Metropolitan Councils and Local Councils
2 November: United States, State and Local elections
Ohio's 11th congressional district, U.S. House of Representatives special election
Ohio's 15th congressional district, U.S. House of Representatives special election
New Jersey, Governor, General Assembly and Senate
Pennsylvania, Commonwealth Court and Superior Court retention elections, and Supreme Court, Superior Court and Commonwealth Court
Virginia, Governor, Lieutenant Governor, Attorney General and House of Delegates
Washington, Court of Appeals
Albuquerque, Mayor and City Council
Atlanta, Mayor and City Council
Aurora, CO, City Council
Boston, Mayor and City Council
Cincinnati, Mayor and City Council
Cleveland, Mayor and City Council
Detroit, Mayor and City Council
King County, Executive and Council
Seattle, Mayor, City Attorney, and City Council
Miami, Mayor and City Commission
Minneapolis, Mayor and City Council
New York City, Mayor, Comptroller, Public Advocate, City Council and Borough Presidents
Pittsburgh, Mayor and City Council
Tucson, City Council
Wichita, City Council
6 November: Nigeria, Anambra, Governor
7 November: 
Canada, Quebec, Mayors and Municipal Councils
Montreal, Mayor and City Council
Quebec City, 
Switzerland, Fribourg, Council of State (1st round) and Grand Council
13 November: United States, New Orleans, Mayor and City Council (2nd round)
14 November:
Argentina
Buenos Aires, 
Buenos Aires City, 
Catamarca, 
Chaco, 
Formosa, 
La Rioja, 
Mendoza, 
San Luis, 
Santiago del Estero, 
Japan, Hiroshima, Governor
Kosovo, Mayors (2nd round)
15 November: China, Beijing, Haidian District People's Congress
16 November: Denmark, Regional Councils and Municipal Councils
20 November: Malaysia, Malacca, Legislative Assembly
21 November: 
Central African Republic, Municipal Councils (1st round)
Chile, 
Haiti, Local and Municipal
Venezuela, Governors and Legislative Councils of states, Mayors and Municipal Councils
25 November:
Dominica, Grand Bay Constituency, House of Representatives by-election
United Kingdom, North Yorkshire, Police, Fire and Crime Commissioner by-election
27 November: Algeria, Local councils
28 November: 
Switzerland, Fribourg, Council of State (2nd round)
Thailand, Subdistrict Administrative Organisations

December
1 December: China, Jiangsu, Local People's Congress
2 December: United Kingdom, Old Bexley and Sidcup, House of Commons by-election
4 December: 
Australia, New South Wales, Mayors, Regional Councils, City Councils and Shire Councils
Nigeria, Ekiti, Local Government Councils and Chairmen
 6 December: Tobago, Tobago House of Assembly
16 December: United Kingdom, North Shropshire, House of Commons by-election
18 December: Malaysia, Sarawak, Legislative Assembly
21 December: Bhutan, Municipal Councils

References

local
local
Political timelines of the 2020s by year
local